Petro Konashevych-Sahaidachny (born about 1582 in Kulchytsi, today Sambir Raion – 20 April 1622 in Kyiv) was a Ukrainian Cossack political and civic leader, Hetman of Zaporozhian Cossacks from 1616 to 1622, a military leader of Polish–Lithuanian Commonwealth both on land and sea. While being a hetman, he transformed the Cossack Host from an irregular military formation into a regular army. Under his leadership, the Cossacks, the Orthodox clergy and peasants of Ukraine began to emerge as a united nation. His troops played a significant role in the Battle of Khotyn against the Turks in 1621 and Polish Prince Władysław's attempt to gain the throne of Russia in 1618.

In 2011 he was canonized in the Orthodox Church of Ukraine as a Right-Believing hetman. On 20 April 2022 he was further declared by Metropolitan Epifaniy patron saint of the military forces of Ukraine.

Early life

Petro Konashevych was born in Polish–Lithuanian Commonwealth in the village of Kulchytsy (Przemyśl land) three miles away from Sambir in the Ruthenian Voivodeship into a Ukrainian Eastern Orthodox noble family. His father's surname was Kononovych. He graduated from Ostroh Academy in Volhynia. His school mate was Meletiy Smotrytskyi, author of the Hramatyka book, by which many generations of Ukrainians, Russians, and Belarusians learned the Slavic language grammatics. From an early age he learnt the weapon and horsemanship skills. He joined to the cossacks of Zaporozhian Host and took a part in cossack military expeditions to Moldavia in 1600 and Livonia in 1601. His talent in a military strategy, courage and ability to show leadership under great adversity and hardship were acquired by cossacks leader (otaman) Samiylo Kishka. Later, Sahaidachny moved to Lviv, and after to Kiev, where he became the assistant and tutor of the Kyivan judge I. Aksak family.

Career

Early Turkish campaign

By the end of the 16th century, Sahaidachny traveled to Zaporizhia, where in 1605, he was elected as a kosh otaman of the Zaporozhian Host cossacks. Under his control, the Host participated in campaigns against the Crimean Tatars and the Turks. The Сossacks fleet captured the Turkish fortress Varna, burned and destroyed a strong Turkish navy (10,000 ships). He is famous for his sea sorties on Crimea and Turkey and in 1616 captured Caffa (Feodosia) on the Crimean peninsula, the largest center of the slave trade. He released from slavery many Christian men, women and children.

Muscovite campaign
In 1618, Sahaidachny joined the anti-Turkish Holy League. While he was battling the Turks, the Polish–Lithuanian Commonwealth requested his assistance for war with Muscovy (Russian Tsardom); they wanted him to provide Władysław IV Vasa, the King of the Polish–Lithuanian Commonwealth, with 20,000 Cossacks near Moscow. Sahaidachny did, and seized the forts in the cities of Putivl, Kursk, Livny, Yelets and many others. Near Serpukhov Sahaidachny forced the Muscovite army to flee. The Muscovite troops under command of the voivode G. Volkonsky forced the Cossacks to take a detour, but were unable to stop the advance of the Cossacks regiments to Moscow. In September 1618 he forced to flee the army of another Muscovite nobleman, Vasilii Buturlin. Later, the united army of Jan Karol Chodkiewicz and Sahaidachny sieged Moscow and on 11 October unsuccessfully attempted to take the Arbat Gates.

In late October, the army of Sahaidachny moved in a raid towards the south from Moscow. During this raid the army captured the city of Serpukhov, and in early December it captured Kaluga. John III Sobieski wrote that this successful raid caused panic among the Russians and forced them to conclude negotiations as soon as possible. The whole campaign finally culminated in December 1618 by signing the Truce of Deulino, resulting in the greatest territorial expansion of the Commonwealth.

The Cossacks' invasion of Muscovy has been described by Ukrainian historian Valery Smolyi as "not the best page of Sahaidachny's biography". Sahaidachy and his cossacks had been positioning themselves as supporters of the Orthodox Christianity and potential allies of  Muscovy.<ref name="ursr.org">Valery Smolyi, "Peter Sahadachny: knight, politician, man". Vitchizna', 13, #1, 189-194 (1990) (Валерій Смолий, Петро Сагайдачний: воїн, політік, людина. Вїтчизна, 13, №1, 189-194 (1990))] </ref> However, they left the "bloody trace" which extended from Livny to Moscow and back to Kaluga and Kiev. In research of Russian, Ukrainian and American historians Cossacks have been blamed for destroying and robbing Orthodox churches, cities and villages, killing children and women, who belonged to Orthodox (Greek) Christianity.
Later, Sahaidachny asked Patriarch Teophanes III of Jerusalem to forgive him for such behavior.

Sahaidachny returned to Zaporizhia, and did not only become a kosh otaman, but was also the Hetman of Ukraine. (Another source claims that in 1621 he was a colonel of the Commonwealth Registered Cossacks regiment.) In order to avoid conflict with the Poles, Sahaidachny agreed to limit the Cossack register to 3,000 men; the remainder were regarded as peasants ("kholopy"). He also banned unauthorized Cossack sea raids to Turkey and the king gave Sahaidachny the right to be called an elder of the Cossacks ("starshina").

Restoration of the Ukrainian Orthodox hierarchy

Not only did Sahaidachny fight for control, he also fought for the religious and cultural rights of the Ukrainian people. In 1620, he registered himself and his entire Zaporozhian Host as students into the Kiev Epiphany Brotherhood School, that preceded the current Kyiv Mohyla Academy. It was done in order to protect the school from conversion from an Orthodox school into a Roman Catholic Jesuit Collegium. He also contributed to the establishment of a cultural center in Kiev and sought to unite the Cossack military with the Ukrainian clergy and nobility.

In early 1620 Sahaidachny sent an envoy to the Russian tsar. At this time there was the Patriarch Teophanes III of Jerusalem and this envoy held talks with him about the possibility of his arrival in  Ukraine.

In 1620, Sahaidachny convinced Patriarch Teophanes III, who recently returned from Moscow, to reconstruct the Orthodox hierarchy, that was almost destroyed by the creation of the Greek-Catholic Church. As a result, the Metropolis of Kiev, Galicia and all Ruthenia was erected mainly on the territory of the Commonwealth.

Patriarch Teophanes III of Jerusalem blamed Cossacks for the participation in the Muscovy campaign saying that  damnation have been put on them for this, because Muscovites are  Orthodox Christians and in a future they never would fight again against them.Valery Smolyi, Peter Sahadachny: knight, politician, man.  Vitchizna, 13, #1, 189-194 (1990) (Валерій Смолий, Петро Сагайдачний: воїн, політік, людина. Вїтчизна, 13, №1, 189-194 (1990)) 

The patriarch appointed Iov Boretsky as a Kievan Metropolitan bishop and five other bishops at the same time. Because the Polish–Lithuanian Commonwealth had threatened to arrest Teophanes III as a spy, Sahaidachny was guaranteed his protection by the patriarch. After the new metropoliten and bishops were installed, Sahaidachny escorted the patriarch to the Ottoman border with a 3,000 men Cossack army.

The Polish–Lithuanian Commonwealth accepted the appointment, because it wanted to keep close contacts with Sahaidachny after the Turks defeated the Polish army at the Battle of Ţuţora (1620).

Because of Sahaidachny's moderate policies towards Commonwealth, he provoked dissatisfaction among the Cossacks, and in 1620, they briefly elected Yatsko Borodavka as hetman.

Battle of Khotyn

In 1621, the famous Battle of Khotyn had occurred, where close to 80,000 Cossacks and Polish troops fought against 160,000 Turkish army. The battle held at bay for a whole month, until the first snow compelled Osman II to withdraw his weakened forces. Sahaidachny and his army played a significant role in the battle, forcing the Turks to sign an unfavorable peace treaty. During the battle, Sahaidachny was seriously wounded. After the battle, the Polish king sent Sahaidachny a sword in recognition of his services.

Death

On 20 April 1622 Sahaidachny died in Kiev from wounds he suffered at the Battle of Khotyn. He was later buried in the Bratsky Monastery of Kiev. He left his assets to the brotherhood schools in Kiev and Lviv for church causes. His legacy was so great, that most of the population of Kiev attended his funeral en masse. Sahaidachny's work, About Union, was highly regarded by the Lithuanian Kanclerz Lew Sapieha. In 1646, John III Sobieski, a monarch of the Polish–Lithuanian Commonwealth, said the following about Sahaidachny:

Polish historian Jan Widacki wrote that Konashevych-Sahaidachny was among Zaporozhian hetmans the one most loyal to Poland. He was a supporter of the Polish-Ukrainian military cooperation against the enemies of the Commonwealth.

Legacy
 Frigate "Hetman Sahaidachny" – a flagship of the Ukrainian Navy for over 20 years.
 National Ground Forces Academy in Lviv is named after hetman Petro Sahaydachyi.Germany to send military advisers to Ukraine, UNIAN (9 December 2016)
 In 2001 a monument dedicated to Petro Konashevich-Sagaydachniy was erected in Kyiv, on Kontraktova Square. The authors of the monument are Valeriy Shvetsov, Oles Sydoruk and Boris Krylov.
 After the March 2014 Russian annexation of Crimea the monument to Konashevych-Sahaidachny in Sevastopol was removed and handed over to Kharkiv. (Where it was unveiled in August 2015.)
 In Ukraine, there are a number of Petro Sahaidachny streets.
 In honor of Petro Sagaydachny, a higher military educational institution was named - the National Academy of Land Forces named after Hetman Petro Sagaydachny

See also

List of Ukrainian rulers

References

Further reading
 
 
 
 

 External links 
 
 Lubomyr Wynar, Arkadii Zhukovsky, Konashevych-Sahaidachny, Petro, article originally appeared in the Encyclopedia of Ukraine, vol. 2 (1988)
 Orest's Digital Journal — Petro Konashevych Sahaidachny
 Petro Kononovych Sahaydachnyi at the UKROP encyclopedia 
 Dariusz Matelski, Grabież dóbr kultury w wojnach Rzeczypospolitej Obojga Narodów (1569-1795) [Plunder of Cultural Property during wars the Commonwealth of the Two Nations 1569-1795)'', Poznań 2005.
 www.az-kiev.info

1580s births
1622 deaths
Year of birth uncertain
People from Lviv Oblast
Seniors of Registered Cossacks
Hetmans of the Zaporozhian Cossacks
Ruthenian nobility of the Polish–Lithuanian Commonwealth
Zaporozhian Cossack nobility
Eastern Orthodox Christians from Ukraine
Ukrainian Eastern Catholics
Polish people of the Polish–Muscovite War (1605–1618)
Polish people of Ukrainian descent
Kosh Otamans
Boykos